Russky Yurmash (Urıś-Yurmaş) is a rural locality (a selo) and the administrative centre of Russko-Yurmashsky Selsoviet, Ufimsky District, Bashkortostan, Russia. The population was 1,198 as of 2010. There are 22 streets.

Geography 
Russky Yurmash is located 27 km east of Ufa (the district's administrative centre) by road. Yurmash is the nearest rural locality.

References 

Rural localities in Ufimsky District